In the United States, the rights of transgender people vary considerably by jurisdiction. By the end of 2021, at least 130 bills had been introduced in 33 states to restrict the rights of transgender people. In 2022, over 230 anti-transgender bills were introduced in state legislatures in a coordinated national campaign to target transgender rights. In 2023, over 350 bills have been introduced as of mid-February. Many of these bills became law.

The Supreme Court of the United States has only once ruled directly on transgender rights, in 2020; in the case of R.G. & G.R. Harris Funeral Homes Inc. v. Equal Employment Opportunity Commission, the Court held that Title VII protections against sex discrimination in employment extend to transgender employees. The Equality Act, if passed, would prohibit discrimination on the basis of gender identity in employment; housing; public accommodations; education; federally funded programs; credit; and jury service.

U.S. President Barack Obama issued an executive order prohibiting discrimination against transgender people in employment by the federal government and its contractors. In 2016, the Departments of Education and Justice issued a letter to schools receiving federal funding that interpreted Title IX protection to apply to gender identity and transgender students, advising schools to use a student's preferred name and pronouns and to allow use of bathrooms and locker rooms of the student's gender identity.  Recognition and protection against discrimination is provided by some state and local jurisdictions to varying degrees.

Birth certificates are typically issued by the Vital Records Office of the state (or equivalent territory, or capital district) where the birth occurred, and thus the listing of sex as male or female on the birth certificate (and whether or not this can be changed later) is regulated by state (or equivalent) law. However, federal law regulates sex as listed on a Consular Report of Birth Abroad, and other federal documents that list sex or name, such as the U.S. passport and Certificate of Naturalization. Laws concerning name changes in U.S. jurisdictions are also a complex mix of federal and state rules. States vary in the extent to which they recognize transgender people's gender identities, often depending on the steps the person has taken in their transition (including psychological therapy, hormone therapy), with some states making gender affirmation surgery a pre-requisite of recognition.

Non-binary or genderqueer people may seek legal recognition of a gender identity other than that indicated by their birth sex; in 2016, Oregon became the first state to legally recognize non-binary people. When a person's gender is not officially recognized, they may seek associated changes, such as to their legal name, including on their birth certificate.

The Supreme Court's decision in Obergefell v. Hodges established that equal protection requires all jurisdictions to recognize same-sex marriages, giving transgender people the right to marry regardless of whether their partners are legally considered to be same-sex or opposite-sex.

The Matthew Shepard and James Byrd Jr. Hate Crimes Prevention Act, of 2009, added crimes motivated by a victim's actual or perceived gender, sexual orientation, gender identity, or disability to the federal definition of a hate crime. However, only some states and territories include gender identity in their hate crime laws.

Marriage
In Obergefell v. Hodges, the Court ruled that people have a right to marry without regard to sex. While this is commonly understood as a ruling allowing same-sex marriage, it also meant that a person's sex, whether assigned at birth or recognized following transitioning, can not be used to determine their eligibility to marry. Prior to this ruling, the right of transgender people to marry was often subject to legal challenge—as was the status of their marriages after transitioning, particularly in cases where an individual's birth sex was interpreted to mean a same-sex marriage had taken place.

Cases
In 1959, Christine Jorgensen, a trans woman, was denied a marriage license by a clerk in New York City, on the basis that her birth certificate listed her as male; Jorgensen did not  pursue the matter in court. Later that year, Charlotte McLeod, another trans woman who underwent sex reassignment surgery, married her husband Ralph H. Heidel in Miami. She did not mention her birth sex, however, or the fact she was still legally male. In 1976, the New Jersey case M.T. v. J.T. held that trans people who had undergone sex reassignment surgery could marry as the legal sex matching their gender identity, the first ruling of its kind. Here the court expressly considered the English Corbett v. Corbett decision, but rejected its reasoning.

In Littleton v. Prange, (1999), Christie Lee Littleton, a trans woman who had undergone sex reassignment surgery, argued to the Texas 4th Court of Appeals that her marriage to her genetically male husband (deceased) was legally binding and hence she was entitled to his estate. The court decided that plaintiff's sex is equal to her chromosomes, which were XY (male). The court subsequently invalidated her revision to her birth certificate, as well as her Kentucky marriage license, ruling "We hold, as a matter of law, that Christie Littleton is a male. As a male, Christie cannot be married to another male. Her marriage to Jonathon was invalid, and she cannot bring a cause of action as his surviving spouse." She appealed to the Supreme Court but it denied certiorari in 2000.

The Kansas Appellate Court ruling in In re Estate of Gardiner (2001) considered and rejected Littleton, preferring M.T. v. J.T. instead. In this case, the Kansas Appellate Court concluded that "[A] trial court must consider and decide whether an individual was male or female at the time the individual's marriage license was issued and the individual was married, not simply what the individual's chromosomes were or were not at the moment of birth. The court may use chromosome makeup as one factor, but not the exclusive factor, in arriving at a decision. Aside from chromosomes, we adopt the criteria set forth by Professor Greenberg. On remand, the trial court is directed to consider factors in addition to chromosome makeup, including: gonadal sex, internal morphologic sex, external morphologic sex, hormonal sex, phenotypic sex, assigned sex and gender of rearing, and sexual identity." In 2002, the Kansas Supreme Court reversed the Appellate court decision in part, following Littleton.

The custody case of Michael Kantaras made national news. Kantaras met another woman and filed for divorce in 1998, requesting primary custody of the children. Though he won that case in 2002, it was reversed on appeal in 2004 by the Florida Second District Court of Appeal, upholding Forsythe's claim that the marriage was null and void because her ex-husband was still a woman and same-sex marriages were illegal in Florida. Review was denied by the Florida Supreme Court.

In re Jose Mauricio LOVO-Lara (2005), the Board of Immigration Appeals ruled that for purposes of an immigration visa, "A marriage between a postoperative transsexual and a person of the opposite sex may be the basis for benefits under ..., where the State in which the marriage occurred recognizes the change in sex of the postoperative transsexual and considers the marriage a valid heterosexual marriage."

In Fields v. Smith (2006), three transgender women filed a lawsuit against this state of Wisconsin for passing a law banning hormone treatment or sex reassignment surgery for inmates. The courts of appeal struck down the law issuing that transgender people have a right to medical access in prison.

Parental rights
There is little consistency across courts in the treatment of transgender parent in child custody and visitation cases. In some cases, a parent's transgender status is not weighed in a court decision; in others, rulings are made on the basis of a transgender person being presumed to be an inherently unfit parent.

Courts are generally allowed to base custody or visitation rulings only on factors that directly affect the best interests of the child. According to this principle, if a transgender parent's gender identity cannot be shown to hurt the child, contact should not be limited, and other custody and visitation orders should not be changed for this reason. Many courts have upheld this principle and have treated transgender custody cases like any other child custody determination—by focusing on standard factors such as parental skills. In Mayfield v. Mayfield, for instance, the court upheld a transgender parent's shared parenting plan because there was no evidence in the record that the parent would not be a "fit, loving and capable parent".

Other times, courts claiming to consider a child's interests have ruled against the transgender parent, leading to the parent losing access to their children on the basis of their gender identity. For example, in Cisek v. Cisek, the court terminated a transgender parent's visitation rights, holding that there was a risk of both mental and "social harm" to the children. The court asked whether the parent's sex change was "simply an indulgence of some fantasy". An Ohio court imposed an indefinite moratorium on visitation based on the court's belief that it would be emotionally confusing for the children to see "their father as a woman".

Reproductive rights
Transgender people who have not undergone complete sex reassignment surgery are still able to procreate. However, many U.S. jurisdictions require surgery in order to change the trans person's legal sex. This has been criticized as forced sterilization. Some trans people wish to retain their ability to procreate. Others do not medically require hysterectomy, phalloplasty, metoidioplasty, penectomy, orchiectomy, or vaginoplasty to treat their gender dysphoria. In these cases, surgery is considered medically unnecessary and, for that reason, medically unethical. Additionally, surgery is generally the final series of medical procedures in a complete sex transition, and is financially prohibitive for many people.

Some transgender people use assisted reproduction technology services and preservation of reproductive tissue prior to having surgery that would render them infertile. Depending on what type of gametes the person's body naturally produces, this would include cryopreservation of semen in a sperm bank or preservation of oocytes or ovum. For such individuals, access to surrogacy and in vitro fertilization services is necessary to have children. Some people advocate specifically for transgender people to have a legal right to these services.

Identity documents
Identity documents are a major area of legal concern for transgender people. Different procedures and requirements for legal name changes and gender marker changes on birth certificates, drivers licenses, social security identification and passports exist and can be inconsistent.  Many states have historically required sex reassignment surgery to change their name and gender marker; however, there are increasingly few states where this is the case, with Alabama being one of the last.  Also, documents which do not match each other can present difficulties in conducting personal affairs—particularly those which require multiple, matching forms of identification.  Furthermore, having documents which do not match a person's gender presentation has been reported to lead to harassment and discrimination.

Name change
Transgender people often seek legal recognition for a name change during a gender transition. Laws regarding name changes vary state-by-state. In some states, transgender people can change their name, provided that the change does not perpetrate fraud or enable criminal intent. In other states, the process requires a court order or statute and can be more difficult. An applicant may be required to post legal notices in newspapers to announce the name change—rules that have been criticized on grounds of privacy rights and potentially endangering transgender people to targeted hate crimes.  Some courts require medical or psychiatric documentation to justify a name change, despite having no similar requirement for individuals changing names for reasons other than gender transitioning.

Birth certificates

U.S. states make their own laws about birth certificates, and state courts have issued varied rulings about transgender people.

Most states permit the name and sex to be changed on a birth certificate, either by amending the existing birth certificate or by issuing a new one, although some require medical proof of sex reassignment surgery to do so. These include:
 Texas, by opinion of the local clerk's office, will make a court-ordered change of sex.
 New York State and New York City both passed legislation in 2014 to ease the process for changing sex on the birth certificate, eliminating the requirement for proof of surgery.
 Nevada eliminated the surgery requirement in November 2016. It requires an affidavit from the person making the change and an affidavit who can attest that the information is accurate.
 Colorado (February 2019) and New Mexico (November 2019) eliminated the surgery requirement and made the gender marker "X" available.
 Kansas began allowing changes to the gender marker in June 2019. The person must sign an affidavit. If they do not already have documentation (driver's license or passport) with their preferred gender marker, they must bring a letter from a doctor or psychotherapist affirming their gender, but they do not need proof of surgery. Regulations were set up under a signed executive order for the Kansas Department of Health by the Governor of Kansas.
 Virginia removed the requirement for surgery to change the gender marker in September 2020.

Tennessee will not change the sex on a birth certificate under any circumstances. In December 2020, a federal judge invalidated an unconstitutional departmental rule banning sex changes on an individual's birth certificate within Ohio. In 2022, Oklahoma became the second state to ban legal gender marker change on birth certificates. This followed an executive order issued by the governor the previous year. Oklahoma Senate Bill 1100 also banned non-binary gender markers on birth certificates. During the same year, Montana also issued a rule that banned legal gender change on birth certificates.

Cases
The first case to consider legal gender change in the U.S. was Mtr. of Anonymous v. Weiner (1966), in which a transgender woman wished to change her name and sex on her birth certificate in New York City after having undergone sex reassignment surgery. The New York City Health Department denied the request. She took the case to court, but the court ruled that the New York City Health Code did not permit the request, which only permitted a change of sex on the birth certificate if an error was made recording it at birth.

The decision of the court in Weiner was again affirmed in Mtr. of Hartin v. Dir. of Bur. of Recs. (1973) and Anonymous v. Mellon (1977). Despite this, there can be noted as time progressed an increasing support expressed in judgments by New York courts for permitting changes in birth certificates, even though they still held to do so would require legislative action. Classification of characteristic sex is a public health matter in New York; and New York City has its own health department which operates separately and autonomously from the New York State health department.

An important case in Connecticut was Darnell v. Lloyd (1975), where the court found that substantial state interest must be demonstrated to justify refusing to grant a change in sex recorded on a birth certificate.

In K. v. Health Division (1977), the Oregon Supreme Court rejected an application for a change of name or sex on the birth certificate of a transgender man who had undergone sex reassignment surgery, on the grounds that there was no legislative authority for such a change to be made.

Driver's licenses
All U.S. states allow the gender marker to be changed on a driver's license, although the requirements for doing so vary by state. Often, the requirements for changing one's driver's license are less stringent than those for changing the marker on the birth certificate. For example, until August 1, 2015, the state of Massachusetts required sex reassignment surgery for a birth certificate change, but only a form including a sworn statement from a physician that the applicant is in fact the new gender to correct the sex designation on a driver's license.
As of November 2019, the Commonwealth of Massachusetts no longer requires any documentation or a sworn statement from a medical doctor in order to change one's gender marker on their drivers license/state ID.  In order to change the gender marker, one only needs to fill out a new drivers license/ID card application reflecting the correct information. 
The state of Virginia has policies similar to those of Massachusetts, requiring SRS for a birth certificate change, but not for a driver's license change.

Sometimes, the states' requirements and laws conflict with and are dependent on each other; for example, a transgender woman who was born in Tennessee but living in Kentucky will be unable to have the gender marker changed on her Kentucky driver's license. This is due to the fact that Kentucky requires an amended birth certificate reflecting the person's accurate gender, but the state of Tennessee does not change gender markers on birth certificates at all.

In addition, a number of states and city jurisdictions have passed legislation to allow a third gender marker on official identification documents (see below).

Cases
In May 2015, six Michigan transgender people filed Love v. Johnson in the United States District Court for the Eastern District of Michigan, challenging the state's policy requiring the information on a person's driver's license match the information on their birth certificate. This policy requires transgender people to change the information on their birth certificates in order to change their driver's licenses, which at the time of filing was not possible in Tennessee, Nebraska and Ohio, where three of the plaintiffs were born, and requires a court order in South Carolina, where a fourth was born. The remaining two residents were born in Michigan, and would be required to undergo surgery to change their birth certificates. The plaintiffs in the case are represented by the American Civil Liberties Union.

In November 2015, Judge Nancy Edmunds denied the State of Michigan's motion to dismiss the case.

Passports
The State Department determines what identifying biographical information is placed on passports.

On June 30, 2021, the government announced that the State Department would begin offering an "X" gender marker and would also allow changing one's gender marker without proving any physical changes to one's sex. Previously, the policy had been amended on June 10, 2010 to allow permanent gender marker changes only if accompanied by a physician's statement that "the applicant has had appropriate clinical treatment for gender transition to the new gender." Before 2010, the required statement was more specific; it was required to be from a surgeon who said that gender reassignment surgery had been completed.

From April 11, 2022, any individual who is a valid US passport holder can legally have F, M or X options listed as a sex/gender marker available and recognized by way of self determination. Starting in late 2023, X will also be available for passport cards, emergency passports made by consulates and embassies, consular reports of birth abroad.

Persons not born in the United States 
Persons not born in the United States and who hold status in the United States can change the gender marker on their USCIS-issued Certificate of Naturalization, Certificate of Citizenship, Permanent Resident Card, and their State Department-issued Consular Report of Birth Abroad; these serve as foundational identity documents that may be substituted for birth certificates.

Other options include obtaining a state court order affirming the change of legal gender as a linking document, such as California's Order Recognizing Change of Gender.

Third gender option

As of 2021, the U.S. federal government recognizes a third gender option on passports or other national identity documents, joining other countries including Australia, New Zealand, India, Nepal, Pakistan, Bangladesh, Germany, Malta, and Canada that also recognize this. Third genders have traditionally been acknowledged in a number of Native American cultures as "two spirit" people, in traditional Hawaiian culture as the māhū, and as the fa'afafine in American Samoa. Similarly, immigrants from traditional cultures that acknowledge a third gender would benefit from such a reform, including the muxe gender in southern Mexico and the hijra of south Asian cultures.

On June 10, 2016, an Oregon circuit court ruled that a resident, Elisa Rae Shupe, could obtain a non-binary gender designation. The Transgender Law Center believes this to be "the first ruling of its kind in the U.S."

On September 26, 2016, intersex California resident Sara Kelly Keenan became the second person in the United States to legally change her gender to 'non-binary'. Keenan, who uses she/her pronouns, cited Shupe's case as inspiration for her petition. Keenan later obtained a birth certificate with an intersex sex marker. In press reporting of this decision, it became apparent that Ohio had issued an 'hermaphrodite' sex marker in 2012.

On January 26, 2017, a bill was introduced in the California State Senate that would create a third, nonbinary gender marker on California birth certificates, drivers' licenses, and identity cards. The bill, SB 179, would also remove the requirements for a physician's statement and mandatory court hearing for gender change petitions. This bill was signed into law on October 15, 2017; the non-binary option became available on January 1, 2019.

On June 15, 2017, Oregon became the first state in the U.S. to announce it will allow a non-binary "X" gender marker on state IDs and driver's licenses. The law took effect July 1. No doctor's note is required for the change. The following week, Washington, D.C., announced that a non-binary "X" gender marker for district-issued ID cards and driver's licenses would very shortly be offered with no medical certification required. The D.C. policy change went into effect on June 27, making the district the first place in the U.S. to offer gender-neutral driver's licenses and ID cards. In June 2018, Maine began issuing yellow stickers to cover part of the ID card with the statement "Gender has been changed to: X – Non-binary". In July 2018, New Jersey enacted legislation to permit people to amend birth and death certificates to reflect their identity as female, male, or "undesignated" without requiring a physician to provide proof of surgery. In October 2018, it was reported that Minnesota would offer an "X" as part of REAL ID. Since November 2018, Colorado has legally provided gender X on driver's license forms and other I.Ds.

Legislation to offer an "X" gender marker for residents' ID cards was introduced in New York state in June 2017 (and was introduced in New York City in June 2018), and in Massachusetts in May 2018. New York city began offering birth certificates with an "X" gender marker in January 2019. Ohio began offering "X" gender marker in August 2020.

On October 27, 2021, the State Department issued the first passport with an "X" gender marker.

US jurisdictions with "gender X" driver's licences
Many jurisdictions in the US currently offer third gender markers on driver's licenses, including Arkansas, California, Colorado, Connecticut, Delaware, Washington D.C., Hawai'i, Massachusetts, Maine, Maryland, Michigan, Minnesota, Nevada, New Hampshire, New Jersey, New York, Ohio, Oregon, Pennsylvania, Rhode Island, Utah, Virginia, Vermont, and Washington.

Laws offering an "X" gender marker on driver's licenses and state identification cards have also been passed in several US jurisdictions, but have not gone into effect yet namely—New Jersey and Illinois (sometime in 2024 due to delays by government contracts from third parties).

Death certificates

A study conducted by Oregon epidemiologists found that within the area of Portland, Oregon, more than half of dead trans people were recorded as their assigned sex at birth on their death certificates.

Housing

According to the 2015 US Transgender Health Survey, 30% of trans people (41% for black trans people) experience homelessness at some point in their lives. According to the Vera Institute, trans people in crisis centers and shelters suffer routine verbal and physical abuse.

In 2020, the Trump Administration rolled back Obama-era protections for transgender people protecting equal access to homeless shelters, and issued a guide for shelter staff on how to spot a trans woman.

Allegations of genocide

Some US laws have been described, including by journalists Emily St. James and Saeed Jones and activist Chase Strangio, as fitting the United Nations definition of genocide, such as those banning proper transgender healthcare ("causing serious bodily or mental harm to members of the group; deliberately inflicting on the group conditions of life calculated to bring about its physical destruction in whole or in part"), and those mandating that trans children be taken away by the state ("forcibly transferring children of the group to another group").

The compiling of lists of transgender citizens, such as that done by the state of Texas, has been criticized by trans advocates who feared the state would "use the information to further persecute the already vulnerable trans community."

The increased targeting of trans people by right wing militia groups has also been described as threatening genocide, and has led many trans people in the United States to, in response, stockpile weapons and gear - including AR-15 rifles and modern body armor - while training, sometimes in groups, to use them as necessary.

Physical violence

A 2014 report by the Department of Justice found that 2% of trans people report being physically attacked upon visiting a doctor's office, with 3% reporting being forcibly subjected to unwanted medical procedures.

According to a study published by the UCLA Williams Institute, transgender people are the victims of violent crimes at over four times the rate of cisgender people. The study found that from 2017 to 2018, trans people experienced violent victimizations at a rate of 86.2 per 1000 people, compared to 21.7 among cis people. Trans women suffered at a rate of 86.1 per 1000, compared to cis women's 23.7, and trans men suffered at a rate of 107.5 per 1000 compared to cis men's 19.8.

According to the Department of Justice in 2022, 50% of people who die in anti-LGBT hate crimes are trans women, with sexual assault being a frequent occurrence after their murders. Additionally, 50% of transgender people are physically abused after coming out as trans to a significant other.

In June 2022, NBC reported "Events for transgender rights (…) have become frequent targets of extremists, militias, and far-right personalities".

In August 2022, a draft report from the California Attorney General's Office found that trans people were four times more likely to be stopped by police for "reasonable suspicion" than cis people.

Sexual violence

According to the Department of Justice in 2022, 66% of trans people experience sexual assault at some point in their lives. 15% of trans people report being sexually assaulted by police or prison staff (32% for African-American trans people), while another 10% report being sexually assaulted by healthcare professionals. An older study conducted by the DOJ in 2014 also found that it was not uncommon for psychiatric professionals to mandate that trans patients of theirs perform sexual favors for them in exchange for continued access to gender affirming healthcare.

The Trafficking in Persons report by the State Department found that trans people are significantly overrepresented in sex trafficking victims, and a study by Loyola University Chicago found that trans people in the US are 5.6x more likely to engage in survival sex - where sex is traded for money, food, shelter, or other essential items such as phones or clothing - than their cis peers.

According to the 2015 US Transgender survey, 13% of K-12 students who were out as or perceived as transgender were sexually assaulted specifically for being transgender.

Displacement

Anti-trans legislation in numerous conservative states has forced many trans people and their families to flee their homes, whether to another state or another country, including the families of those who actively advocated against anti-trans laws in their states.

Sanctuary states
A number of states have passed laws protecting trans people and their families, as well as their healthcare providers, fleeing anti-trans states, from extradition. In 2022, Connecticut became the first state to implement such a law, alongside similar protections for reproductive healthcare providers and recipients. Since then, Massachusetts, California, Illinois, and Washington DC have passed similar laws.

Discrimination protections

Employment

In June 2020, the Court ruled for the first time on a case directly regarding Transgender rights. In the case R.G. & G.R. Harris Funeral Homes Inc. v. Equal Employment Opportunity Commission the Supreme Court held that Title VII of the Civil Rights Act 1964 extends protections to individuals who are transgender in Employment. This is based on discrimination on the grounds of transgender status is a form of discrimination based on sex. Prior to the rulings that Title VII protections covered transgender status, four states (Alaska, Arizona, Wisconsin, and Missouri) had not enacted specific protections based on transgender status in any employment, and 22 states had extended protections to public employment only.

Laws

Federal
There is no federal law designating transgender as a protected class, or specifically requiring equal treatment for transgender people.  Some versions of the Employment Non-Discrimination Act introduced in the U.S. Congress have included protections against discrimination for transgender people, but as of 2021 no version of ENDA has passed.  Whether or not to include such language has been a controversial part of the debate over the bill. In 2016 and again in 2017, Rep. Pete Olson [R-TX] introduced legislation to strictly interpret gender identity according to biology, which would end federal civil rights protection of gender identity. It remains legal at the federal level for parents to subject transgender children to conversion therapy.

On October 4, 2017, Attorney General Jeff Sessions released a Department of Justice memo stating that Title VII of the 1964 Civil Rights Act prohibits discrimination based on sex, which he stated "is ordinarily defined to mean biologically male or female,"  but the law "does not prohibit discrimination based on gender identity per se."

On January 30, 2012, HUD Secretary Shaun Donovan  announced new regulations that would require all housing providers that receive HUD funding to prevent housing discrimination based on sexual orientation or gender identity. These regulations went into effect on March 5, 2012.

State and local
Over 225 jurisdictions including the District of Columbia (as of 2016) and 22 states (as of 2018) feature legislation that prohibit discrimination based on gender identity in either employment, housing, and/or public accommodations. In Anchorage, Alaska, voters chose in April 2018 to keep the existing protections for transgender people. In Massachusetts, a state law prohibited discrimination in public accommodations on the basis of gender identity; in October 2016, anti-transgender activists submitted the minimum number of signatures necessary to the Secretary of the Commonwealth of within Massachusetts to put the law up for repeal on a statewide ballot measure, Massachusetts voters chose on November 6, 2018 to retain the state law, with 68% in favor of upholding law, and 32% opposed. The Massachusetts Gender Identity Anti-Discrimination Initiative was the first-ever statewide ballot question of its kind in the United States.

Some states and cities have banned conversion therapy for minors.

Cases
In 2000, a court ruling in Connecticut determined that conventional sex discrimination laws protected transgender persons. However, in 2011, to clarify and codify this ruling, a separate law was passed defining legal anti-discrimination protections on the basis of gender identity.

On October 16, 1976, the Court rejected plaintiff's appeal in sex discrimination case involving termination from teaching job after sex reassignment surgery from a New Jersey school system.

Carroll v. Talman Fed. Savs. & Loan Association, 604 F.2d 1028, 1032 (7th Cir.) 1979, held that dress codes are permissible. "So long as [dress codes] and some justification in commonly accepted social norms and are reasonably related to the employer's business needs, such regulations are not necessarily violations of Title VII even though the standards prescribed differ somewhat for men and women."

In Ulane v. Eastern Airlines Inc. 742 F.2d 1081 (7th Cir. 1984) Karen Ulane, a pilot who was assigned male at birth, underwent sex reassignment surgery to attain typically female characteristics. The Seventh Circuit denied Title VII sex discrimination protection by narrowly interpreting "sex" discrimination as discrimination "against women" [and denying Ulane's womanhood].

The case of Price Waterhouse v. Hopkins 490 U.S. 228 (1989), expanded the protection of Title VII by prohibiting gender discrimination, which includes sex stereotyping. In that case, a woman who was discriminated against by her employer for being too "masculine" was granted Title VII relief.

Oncale v. Sundowner Offshore Services, Inc. 523 U.S. 75 (1998), found that same-sex sexual harassment is actionable under Title VII.

A gender stereotype is an assumption about how a person should dress which could encompass a significant range of transgender behavior. This potentially significant change in the law was not tested until Smith v. City of Salem 378 F.3d 566, 568 (6th Cir. 2004). Smith, a trans woman, had been employed as a lieutenant in the fire department without incident for seven years. After doctors diagnosed Smith with Gender Identity Disorder ("GID"), she began to experience harassment and retaliation following complaint. She filed Title VII claims of sex discrimination and retaliation, equal protection and due process claims under 42 U.S.C. § 1983, and state law claims of invasion of privacy and civil conspiracy. On appeal, the Price Waterhouse precedent was applied at p. 574: "[i]t follows that employers who discriminate against men because they do wear dresses and makeup, or otherwise act femininely, are also engaging in sex discrimination, because the discrimination would not occur but for the victim's sex." Chow (2005 at p214) comments that the Sixth Circuit's holding and reasoning represents a significant victory for transgender people. By reiterating that discrimination based on both sex and gender expression is forbidden under Title VII, the court steers transgender jurisprudence in a more expansive direction.  But dress codes, which frequently have separate rules based solely on gender, continue. Carroll v. Talman Fed. Savs. & Loan Association, 604 F.2d 1028, 1032 (7th Cir.) 1979, has not been overruled.

Harrah's implemented a policy named "Personal Best", in which it dictated a general dress code for its male and female employees. Females were required to wear makeup, and there were similar rules for males. One female employee, Darlene Jesperson, objected and sued under Title VII. In Jespersen v. Harrah's Operating Co., No. 03-15045 (9th Cir. April 14, 2006), plaintiff conceded that dress codes could be legitimate but that certain aspects could nevertheless be demeaning; plaintiff also cited Price Waterhouse.  The Ninth Circuit disagreed, upholding the practice of business-related gender-specific dress codes. When such a dress code is in force, an employee amid transition could find it impossible to obey the rules.

In Glenn v. Brumby, the 11th Circuit Court of Appeals held that the Equal Protection Clause prevented the state of Georgia from discriminating against an employee for being transgender.

Education

The Obama administration took the position that Title IX's prohibition on discrimination on the basis of "sex" encompasses discrimination on the basis of gender identity and gender expression. In 2016, the Fourth Circuit became the first Court of Appeals to agree with the administration on the scope of Title IX as applied to transgender students, in the case of Virginia high school student Gavin Grimm (G.G. v. Gloucester County School Board).  The validity of the executive's position is being tested further in the federal courts. In 2017 the ACLU, representing Grimm, stated that they had stopped Grimm's "request for an immediate halt to the Gloucester County School Board's policy prohibiting him and other transgender students from using the common restrooms at school" but were "moving forward with his claim for damages and his demand to end the anti-trans policy permanently." Judge Allen of the U.S. District Court of the Eastern District of Virginia, in May 2018, ruled that Grimm's discrimination claim was valid based upon Title IX and the U.S. Constitution's equal protection clause.

In 2014, Maryland Senate passed a bill that "bans discrimination based on sexual orientation and sexual identity but includes an exemption for religious organizations, private clubs and educational institutions.

According to the Vera Institute in 2016, "transgender youth are more likely to leave school due to harassment, physical assault, and sexual violence".

In 2016, guidance was issued by the Departments of Justice and Education stating that schools which receive federal money must treat a student's gender identity as their sex (for example, in regard to bathrooms). However, this policy was revoked in 2017.

In 2022, the state of Florida enacted the "Parental Rights in Education Bill", commonly known as the "Don't Say Gay Bill", banning any "classroom discussion about sexual orientation or gender identity" by school personnel or third parties, up through third grade. For older students, any discussion of such must be "age appropriate or developmentally appropriate", with the goal to, according to the text of the legislation, "reinforce the fundamental right of parents to make decisions regarding the upbringing and control of their children". As of July 2022, five more states have enacted similar laws. In early 2023, a national proposal was introduced as HR 5, "The Parents Bill of Rights Act."

In July 2022, the Florida Department of Education issued a memo to all Florida schools referring to transgender non-discrimination policies regarding access to public facilities as "imposing a sexual ideology" on schools, and saying that any school that did not sufficiently discriminate against transgender students could be in an acting violation of state law.

That same month, Texas along with more than 20 other states sued the U.S. Department of Agriculture to overturn its policy requiring schools participating in federal food assistance programs to investigate allegations of discrimination due to sexual orientation or gender identity.

Local school boards
Local K-12 school boards have adopted a variety of policies regarding trans students, ranging from allowing fully equal rights and non-discrimination for trans students, to requiring trans students to submit to a criminal background check to be allowed to use the bathroom consistent with their gender identity, to implementing full bans on expressing one's self-declared gender at all, including bans on chosen pronouns and pride flags, to even bans on mentioning the very existence of trans people.

Employment

In a 2021 survey by the UCLA Williams Institute, 48.8% of trans people reported experiencing employment discrimination due to their trans status. 43.8% reported receiving verbal harassment in the workplace for being trans, and 22.4% reported being sexually harassed in the workplace in the preceding five years.

According to the Human Rights Campaign, in 2021 transgender women in the US were paid 60 cents for every dollar the average worker was paid.

A study conducted by the Center for Public Integrity in July 2022 found that in preceding month, 30% of trans adults had lost their jobs or lived with someone who had, and that in that month trans people experienced hunger at more than twice the rate that cis people did.

Public factors

Public support for transgender people has shifted in recent years.

According to the Public Religion Research Institute, support for mandating that trans people use the bathroom corresponding to their gender assigned at birth has risen among all religious groups, with white protestant evangelicals being the highest change, going from 41% in support to 72% in support between 2017 and 2021. 41% of total Americans hold this stance, with 31% disagreeing, and 28% not holding a position on the issue.

60% of American adults reported in the summer of 2022 that they opposed allowing nonbinary marker options on government documents, while 58% reported supporting mandating that trans athletes compete on teams matching their gender assigned at birth.

Social media
In 2019, a report analyzing 10 million US and UK social media posts over three and a half years found that of that 10 million social media posts, 15% (1.5 million) expressed transphobic sentiment.

A study conducted by Media Matters between February 2019 and February 2020 found that the top five most-interacted sources on Facebook regarding transgender people were LifeSite News, the Daily Caller, the Daily Wire, Western Journal, and the Alliance Defending Freedom, with right wing sources on trans issues receiving 43.33 million interactions, compared to left wing sources receiving only 2.56 million.

In the wake of the Colorado Springs nightclub shooting, in which a man walked into an LGBTQ nightclub and opened fire, Twitter unbanned the accounts of several major anti-trans figures that had previously been suspended for breaking twitter policies regarding the targeting of LGBTQ people, while reformatting its hateful conduct policy so that a provision that banned "targeted misgendering or deadnaming of transgender individuals" was "now effectively dead", according to Vanity Fair.

Politicians

In February 2022, United States Senate candidate J. D. Vance from Ohio falsely attributed the then looming Russian invasion of Ukraine to transgender rights, saying "We didn't serve in the Marine Corps to go and fight Vladimir Putin because he didn't believe in transgender rights" 

In May 2022, United States Representative Paul Gosar issued a statement via Twitter falsely claiming that the mass shooter in the Uvalde school shooting which killed 19 elementary school children, was a "transsexual leftist illegal alien".

A joint report by the Human Rights Campaign and the Center for Countering Digital Hate found that the Twitter accounts of Representative Marjorie Taylor Greene and Representative Lauren Boebert were among the top three sources in the United States for the promotion and propagation of the grooming conspiracy theory. In response, Lauren Boebert stated via Twitter "My tweets about groomers are only third? Guess that means I have to tweet about these sick, demented groomers even more".

In September 2022, Senator Ted Cruz of Texas cast attention on a gender affirming healthcare doctor at University of Wisconsin, saying "She does this to children. Sterilizes & mutilates them". Providing gender-affirming healthcare to trans minors is considered best practice by the American Medical Association, American Psychiatric Association, the Endocrine Society, American Academy of Pediatrics, and the World Professional Association for Transgender Health.

That same month, Republican Representative Bob Good from Virginia stated his belief that the high suicide rates among trans youth, widely believed to be due to systemic discrimination and lack of access to proper healthcare, were in fact due to sexual "grooming" into being transgender. Senate Candidate Herschel Walker from Georgia was also reported as saying that trans children would not be able to get into heaven.

Media involvement

In April 2022, the left-leaning media watchdog Media Matters published a study stating that within a three week period spanning from March 17 to April 6, Fox News ran 170 segments on trans people, throughout which "the network spread dangerous lies about the trans community and repeatedly invoked the long-debunked myth that trans people pose a threat to minors and seek to groom them".

The New York Times

In June 2022, the New York Times published a front page article titled "The Battle Over Gender Therapy",  which reportedly "uncritically platformed gender-critical group Genspect, and the New York Times Magazines article said the group has held 'web-based seminars that are critical of social and medical transition'", and that "Some parents, who are part of Genspect, told [the author] that they believed the 'rise in trans-identified teenagers was the result of a 'gender cult' – a mass craze'". The Texas Observer described the article as elevating "a handful of outliers and their discredited theories about trans people to prominence they do not enjoy among the medical community" and that "the article echoes right-wing fear-mongering about whether trans kids should be allowed to transition and even suggests their existence could be dangerous to other young people", noting that "the state of Texas is using it as evidence in an ongoing attempt to investigate trans-supportive healthcare as 'child abuse'".

In July 2022, the New York Times published an op-ed falsely attributing the overturning of Roe v. Wade by six conservative Supreme Court justices, to the existence of trans women causing the "erasure" of "women as a biological category". This article was widely circulated, with Representative Rashida Tlaib issuing a statement in response saying that "During escalating assaults on trans people & trans rights nationwide, the New York Times is featuring writers debating whether trans people should even exist and scapegoating this already-marginalized community."

Since then, the New York Times has published several more pieces arguing in favor of restricting access to gender affirming healthcare for trans people, many of which have been widely criticized as "misinformation" by medical experts.

In February 2023, more than 200 NYT contributors signed an open letter expressing "serious concerns about editorial bias in the newspaper's reporting on transgender, non⁠-⁠binary, and gender nonconforming people". The letter characterized the NYT's reporting as using "an eerily familiar mix of pseudoscience and euphemistic, charged language", and raised concerns regarding the NYT's employment practices regarding trans contributors.

Grooming conspiracy theory

Popularization of the grooming conspiracy theory in the United States has been linked to Christopher Rufo, who tweeted in August 2021 about "winning the language war," and James A. Lindsay. Following the Wi Spa controversy in July 2021, Julia Serano noted that there a rise in false accusations of grooming directed towards transgender people, saying that it appeared as if there was a movement to "lay the foundation for just smearing all trans people as child sexual predators." Libs of TikTok (LoTT) also helped popularize the term 'groomer' as a pejorative for LGBT people, supporters of LGBT youth, and those who teach about sexuality. In November 2021 LoTT claimed that the Trevor Project was a "grooming organization" and later in the year claimed that Chasten Buttigieg was "grooming kids."

On February 24, the right wing Heritage Foundation issued a tweet stating that the Florida Don't Say Gay bill "protects young children from sexual grooming". On March 4, Christina Pushaw, press secretary for Florida Governor Ron DeSantis, referred to the Don't Say Gay bill as "an anti-grooming bill" and stated via twitter that anyone against it was "probably a groomer".

Since then, numerous right wing pundits began describing the behavior of parents and teachers who want to allow children to express their transgender identity as grooming, and the term "groomer" has become widely used by conservative media and politicians to imply that the LGBTQ community and their allies are pedophiles or pedophile-enablers. Slate magazine later described the word "grooming" as "the buzzword of the season".

In April 2022, the left-leaning media watchdog Media Matters published a study stating that within a three week period spanning from March 17 to April 6, Fox News ran 170 segments on trans people, throughout which "the network spread dangerous lies about the trans community and repeatedly invoked the long-debunked myth that trans people pose a threat to minors and seek to groom them".

The Canadian Anti-Hate Network has stated that trans people are "slandered the same way homosexual men were slandered in the 70s, and for the same reason: to deny them safety and equal rights," adding that "the far-right and their fellow travellers in the so-called Gender Critical or Trans-Exclusionary Radical Feminist movements use the exact same tropes in a bid to deny equal rights to trans persons." Florence Ashley of the University of Toronto has stated that the focus of the conspiracy on LGBT+ people and on trans people in particular is used to radicalize public opinion towards the far-right, comparing it to the White genocide conspiracy theory.

According to a joint report in August 2022 by the American Human Rights Campaign, and the British Center for Countering Digital Hate found that the 500 most influential hateful "grooming" tweets were seen 72 million times, and that "grooming" tweets from just ten influential sources were seen 48 million times. It also found that Meta, formerly known as Facebook, had accepted up to $24,987 for ads pushing the grooming conspiracy theory, which had been served to users over 2.1 million times, and that twitter - despite saying groomer slurs were a violation its hate speech policy - failed to act on 99% of tweets reported for such.

Restroom access

An area of legal concern for transgender people is access to restrooms which are segregated by gender.  Transgender people have, in the past, been asked for legal identification while entering or using a gendered restroom.  Recent legislation has moved in contradictory directions. On one hand, non-discrimination laws have included restrooms as public accommodations, indicating a right to use gendered facilities which conform with a person's gender identity. On the other, some efforts have been made to insist that individuals use restrooms that match their biological sex, regardless of an individual's gender identity or expression.

 Comprehensive legislation 

Numerous jurisdictions and states have passed or considered so-called "bathroom bills" which restrict the use of bathrooms by transgender people, forcing them to choose facilities in accordance with their biological sex. This includes Florida, Arizona, Kentucky and Texas.

On March 23, 2016, North Carolina passed a comprehensive bathroom restriction bill (the Public Facilities Privacy & Security Act, also known as "HB2"), overriding a prior municipal Charlotte non-discrimination ordinance on the same subject. It was quickly signed into law by Gov. Pat McCrory, but on March 30, 2017, following national controversy, the part of the law related to bathrooms was repealed. According to the ACLU, the partial repeal still allowed discrimination against transgender persons.

In April 2016, objecting to the "bathroom predator myth", a coalition of over 200 U.S. organizations for sexual assault and domestic violence survivors noted that, while "over 200 municipalities and 18 states" had legal protections for transgender people, none of these places had tied an increase in sexual violence to these nondiscrimination laws.

In September 2016, California governor Jerry Brown signed a bill requiring all single-occupancy bathrooms to be gender-neutral, effective since March 1, 2017. California is the first U.S. state to adopt such legislation. Vermont, New Mexico and Illinois have since followed suit in 2019.

On May 2, 2019, Tennessee governor Bill Lee signed into law legislation defining a trans person using the bathroom corresponding with their gender identity as "indecent exposure." The Tennessee Equality Project had complained about the bill's original language, and although that language was altered before it became law, the organization still believed the bill was harmful to trans people.

 Indecent exposure charges for restroom use 

In September 2021, following extensive right wing protests, a Los Angeles trans woman was charged by the LAPD with felony indecent exposure after she was recorded using the women's changing room at a local nude spa. The trans woman had two previous convictions for indecent exposure and a conviction for failing to register as a sex offender. The nude spa in question had an explicitly trans-inclusive policy, and mandated nudity in gender segregated areas.

In February 2023, another trans woman was charged with indecent exposure for using the changing room at the YWCA in Xenia, Ohio, despite the facility's policy also being one of support.

Schools
In Doe v. Regional School Unit, the Maine Supreme Court held that a transgender girl had a right to use the women's bathroom at school because her psychological well-being and educational success depended on her transition. The school, in denying her access, had "treated [her] differently from other students solely because of her status as a transgender girl." The court determined that this was a form of discrimination.

In Mathis v. Fountain-Fort Carson School District 8 (2013), Colorado's Division of Civil Rights found that denying a transgender girl access to the women's restroom at school was discrimination. They reasoned, "By not permitting the [student] to use the restroom with which she identifies, as non-transgender students are permitted to do, the [school] treated the [student] less favorably than other students seeking the same service." Furthermore, the court rejected the school's defense—that the discriminatory policy was implemented to protect the transgender student from harassment—and observed that transgender students are in fact safest when a school does not single them out as different. Based on this finding, it is no longer acceptable to institute different kinds of bathroom rules for transgender and cisgender people.

In May 2016, guidance was issued by the United States Department of Justice and the United States Department of Education stating that schools which receive federal money must treat a student's gender identity as their sex (for example, in regard to bathrooms). However, this policy was revoked in 2017.

In October 2016, the Court agreed to take on  the case of whether a transgender boy, Gavin Grimm, could use the boys' bathroom in his Virginia high school. Grimm was assigned female at birth but is a transgender male. For a while, he was permitted access to the boys' bathroom but was later denied access after a new policy was adopted by the local school board. The ACLU took on the case, stating that girls objected when he tried to use the girls' bathroom in accordance with the new policy and that he was humiliated when the school directed him to use a private bathroom, unlike other boys. After challenging the policy, he won his case in the Court of Appeals in 2015 in a tie vote. This marked the first ruling by an appeals court to find that transgender students are protected under federal laws that ban sex-based discrimination. However, later in 2016 the U.S. Supreme Court agreed to put that ruling on hold. Then in 2017 the U.S. Supreme Court vacated the decision of the 4th U.S. Circuit Court of Appeals and refused to hear the case. Later in 2017, it was announced that the 4th Circuit would send the case back to the district court for the judge to determine whether the case was moot because Grimm graduated. The District Court found the case was not moot, and ruled in favor of Grimm, which was later upheld by the Fourth Circuit on appeal in August 2020, using the Supreme Court's recent decision in Bostock v. Clayton County as a basis for their decision.

A similar case had occurred in the public schools of Dallas, Oregon, which had allowed transgender students to use the restrooms and locker rooms of the school based on their gender identity on the basis of the 2016 federal policy. Parents of other students had sued to have the policy overturned, but the policy was upheld at both the United States District Court for the District of Oregon and the United States Court of Appeals for the Ninth Circuit. The Supreme Court denied to hear the challenge to the Ninth Circuit in November 2020, leaving that decision in place.

Workplace
Rights to restrooms that match one's gender identity have also been recognized in the workplace and are actively being asserted in public accommodations. In Iowa, for example, discrimination in public accommodations on the basis of sexual orientation and gender identity has been prohibited by law since 2007 through the Iowa Civil Rights Act.

In Cruzan v. Special School District #1, decided in 2002, a Minnesota federal appeals court ruled that it is not the job of the transgender person to accommodate the concerns of cisgender people who express discomfort with sharing a facility with a transgender person. Employers need to offer an alternative to the complaining employee in these situations, such as an individual restroom.

Equal Employment Opportunity Commission (EEOC) chair Charlotte A. Burrows issued guidelines in 2021 stating that "employers may not deny an employee equal access to a bathroom, locker room, or shower that corresponds to the employee's gender identity."

Hate crimes legislation

Federal hate crimes legislation include limited protections for gender identity. The Matthew Shepard and James Byrd, Jr. Hate Crimes Prevention Act of 2009 criminalized "willfully causing bodily injury (or attempting to do so with fire, firearm, or other dangerous weapon)" on the basis of an "actual or perceived" identity.  However, protections for hate crimes motivated on the basis of a victim's gender identity or sexual orientation is limited to "crime affect[ing] interstate or foreign commerce or occur[ring] within federal special maritime and territorial jurisdiction." This limitation only applies to gender identity and sexual orientation, and not to race, color, religion or national origin. Therefore, hate crimes which occur outside these jurisdictions are not protected by federal law.

22 states plus Washington D.C. have hate crimes legislation which includes gender identity or expression as a protected group. They are Vermont, Massachusetts, Connecticut, New Jersey, Delaware, Illinois, Maryland, Missouri, Minnesota, Colorado, New Mexico, Nevada, Rhode Island, Washington, Oregon, California, Hawaii, Maine, Tennessee, Puerto Rico, Utah, Virginia and New York. Twenty-seven states have hate-crimes legislation which exclude transgender people. Six states have no hate-crimes legislation at all.

Numerous municipalities have passed hate-crime legislation, some of which include transgender people. However Arkansas, North Carolina and Tennessee recently passed laws which ban municipalities from enacting such protections for sexual orientation, gender identity or expression.

Healthcare
Transgender people confront two major legal issues within the healthcare system: access to health care for gender transitioning and discrimination by health care workers.

 Treatment for children 
The following states currently ban gender-affirming healthcare for people under 18:

 Utah: On January 27, 2023, Governor Spencer Cox signed the bill.
 South Dakota: On February 13, 2023, Governor Kristi Noem signed the bill.
 Mississippi: On February 28, 2023, Governor Tate Reeves signed the bill.
 Tennessee: On March 2, 2023, Governor Bill Lee signed the bill.
 Kentucky: On March 17, 2023, the state legislature passed the bill. Governor Andy Beshear has promised to veto such bills, but the legislature can override his veto.
 Florida: On March 16, 2023, a rule by the Florida Board of Medicine took effect.

Similar attempts have been made in other states.

 Arkansas 
On March 13, 2023, Governor Sarah Huckabee Sanders signed a bill that gives adults 15 years to file malpractice lawsuits for gender-affirming care they received as minors, whereas for other types of care (under preexisting law) a malpractice lawsuit must generally be filed within two years.

In April 2021, the Arkansas legislature—overriding Governor Asa Hutchinson's veto—banned health care providers from treating children under 18 with hormones, puberty blockers, or sex reassignment surgery and from referring them to other providers. The American Civil Liberties Union of Arkansas sued the state, and a federal judge issued an injunction preventing the law from taking effect, saying the law would cause "irreparable harm" to minors if allowed to go into effect. Sex reassignment surgery is not performed on minors in Arkansas. The effect of puberty blockers is shown to be fully reversible. Research is still ongoing as to any potential long term effects or impacts on the developing brain.

The American Academy of Pediatricians recommends avoiding stigma and providing gender-affirming treatment for transgender youth as the best way to prevent anxiety, stress, and suicide. In support of the ban, Arkansas state representative Mary Bentley quoted , and Rep. Jim Wooten said transgender children were equivalent to a child who "comes to you and says, 'I wanna be a cow.'" Other critics called the treatment "genital mutilation" and "experimentation".

 Texas 
In February 2022, Texas Attorney General Ken Paxton issued a legal opinion that considered child medical gender transition to be child abuse under state law. This was followed by Texas Governor Greg Abbott calling on state officials to investigate anyone who provided gender affirming treatment to a child. Abbott also called on both "licensed professionals" and "members of the general public" to report any trans minors or parents of trans minors to the state, with "criminal penalties" for those who knowingly fail to report. After this, five District Attorneys said they would not be following the order. The ACLU and Lambda Legal sued over the order and many medical groups have condemned it. In March 2022, the Texas Third Court of Appeals reinstated a temporary injunction barring enforcement of Abbott's directive.

Randy Mulanax, investigative supervisor with the Texas DFPS, testified in court that cases regarding trans children were being subject to different rules than other cases, with investigation of any child reported, regardless of evidence, being mandatory, and investigators being prohibited from discussing the case over email or text.

In July 2022, Yale University released a point by point rebuttal of the justifications given by Texas and Alabama for their bans on youth gender affirming care, stating that puberty blockers and hormone therapies are in fact safe and effective for treating gender dysphoria, that "these are not close calls or areas of reasonable disagreement", and that both states "ignore established medical authorities and repeat discredited, outdated, and poor-quality information" and repeatedly cite "a fringe group whose listed advisors have limited (or no) scientific and medical credentials and include well known anti-trans activists".

 Idaho 
In March 2022, the Idaho House approved H.675—a piece of legislation which would amend existing laws on female genital mutilation and make it a felony punishable of up to life in prison to provide gender affirming care to transgender children or to cross state lines to provide them such care. The bill was blocked in the Idaho Senate by Republican leaders, who stated their opposition to gender affirming treatment for children, but were worried the bill undermined parental rights. 

 Arizona 
In March 2022, Arizona passed a law prohibiting gender-affirming surgery for minors. It will take effect in March 2023.South Dakota'''

South Dakota's 2020 bill would make it a felony for healthcare providers to provide this care, and it includes an exception to allow them to perform surgeries on intersex children meant to make them fit into the gender binary.

Treatment for adults
In August 2022, the state of Florida voted to require any trans adult seeking gender affirming healthcare to receive approval from the Florida Board of Medicine at least 24 hours in advance.

In May 2022, Alabama enacted a law that made it a felony to provide gender-affirming healthcare to transgender people under 19. The law targets medical professionals.

In January 2023, the state of Utah passed a law stripping liability protections from any doctor who treats a trans person under the age of 25, and allowing any trans person under 25 to retroactively "disaffirm" consent and sue the doctor for providing care they had at the time consented to. In February 2023, South Dakota passed a similar bill, but without any age limit.

 Awareness of providers 
The lack of knowledge and education related to transgender health is an obstacle transgender people face. A 2011 study published in JAMA reported that medical students cover up to "only five hours" of LGBT related content. A different study done by Lambda Legal in 2010 stated that 89.4% of transgender people felt that there are not enough medical providers that are "adequately trained" for their needs. This lack of medical training makes it harder for transgender people to find suitable and proper healthcare. A 2014 report by the Department of Justice found that 50% of trans people had actually had to teach their medical providers about trans healthcare.

 Discrimination 

A 2014 report by the Department of Justice found that 28% of trans people reported being harassed in medical settings, 19% reported being refused care, 2% reported being physically attacked in a doctor's office, 10% reported being sexually assaulted in one, 9% had been involuntarily committed, and 3% subjected to unwanted medical procedures. The report further found that it was not uncommon for trans people to be forced by psychiatric professionals to provide sexual favors in exchange for being allowed continued access to gender affirming medical care.

Transgender people also sometimes experience discrimination by healthcare professionals, who have refused to treat them for conditions both related and unrelated to their gender identity. A 2017 report by the Center for American Progress found 29 percent of transgender people reporting they were denied care by a medical provider in the preceding year due to their gender identity or sexual orientation.  The same study found that 21 percent of trans people reported medical providers used abusive or harsh language when they sought care.

The Affordable Care Act (ACA) of 2010, specifically Section 1557, prohibits sex discrimination in federally funded health care facilities, and in 2012 the federal Department of Health and Human Services (HHS) clarified that this includes discrimination based on transgender status. The government's final rule in 2016 determined that the ACA forbid discrimination based on gender identity. The ACA also forbids insurance providers from refusing to cover a person based on a pre-existing condition, including being transgender. However, a federal judge in Texas in 2016 issued a nationwide injunction stopping the ACA's transgender antidiscrimination protections from taking effect, and in 2019 that same court issued a final ruling that was binding on HHS. On June 12, 2020, the Trump administration issued a new rule stating that sexual orientation and gender identity were not covered under the anti-discrimination protections of the Affordable Care Act. This rule was in effect for nearly a year until it was reversed by the Biden administration, restoring the Obama-era policy.

Complaints sent to HHS during the Trump administration indicated that medical providers were still frequently denying care to transgender people on the basis of their gender identity.

Some jurisdictions have their own laws prohibiting discrimination on the basis of sex, gender identity or gender expression in public accommodations, as well as under medical malpractice and misconduct law.

In 2020, the Supreme Court ruled in Bostock v. Clayton County that discrimination on the basis of sexual orientation or gender identity is necessarily also discrimination "because of sex" as prohibited by Title VII of the Civil Rights Act of 1964, and thus that Title VII protects employees against such discrimination.

A 2022 study on the allocation of ventilators during the pandemic found that respondents across the entire political spectrum were, when presented with the choice between allocating a ventillator to a cisgender man or a transgender person, on average less likely to allocate it to the trans person than to the cis man. In particular, respondents with conservative political leanings, when given a choice between allocating a ventilator to a cis man or a trans woman, were 14.3% less likely to allocate it to the trans woman, and when given a choice between allocating a ventilator to a cis man or a trans man, were 18.6% less likely to allocate it to the trans man.

 Trans Broken Arm Syndrome 

A common form of discrimination in healthcare settings is what is known as "trans broken arm syndrome", in which a doctor mistakenly assumes a trans person's medical ailments as stemming from their trans status or related medical treatment thereof, and the patient is either given incorrect care or denied care entirely on those grounds. This often results in trans patients hiding their trans status when visiting a doctor if the condition isn't related to their trans status, such as a broken arm. This is especially common in rural or more conservative areas.

A 2022 survey from the Center for American Progress revealed that 19 percent of trans individuals had experienced this form of discrimination in the past year.

 Medical privacy 
Transgender people have the right to medical privacy. According to the Health Insurance Portability and Accountability Act (HIPAA), medical providers and insurance companies are prohibited from disclosing any personal medical information including a person's transgender status. HIPAA also allows transgender people to access and receive a copy of their medical records from health care facilities.

 Insurance coverage 

It can be difficult for transgender people to find insurance coverage for their medical needs.

Even though there is medical consensus that hormone therapy and sex reassignment surgery (SRS) are medically necessary for many transgender people, the kinds of health care associated with gender transition are sometimes misunderstood as cosmetic, experimental or simply unnecessary. This has led to public and private insurance companies denying coverage for such treatment. Courts have repeatedly ruled that these treatments may be medically necessary and have recognized gender dysphoria as a legitimate medical condition constituting a "serious medical need".

The ban on Medicare coverage for gender reassignment surgery was repealed by the US Department of Health and Human Services in 2014. Insurance companies, however, still hold the authority to decide whether the procedures are a medical necessity. Thus, insurance companies can decide whether they will provide Medicare coverage for the surgeries.

Under federal tax laws, the Internal Revenue Code, section 213, defines the purpose of "medical care" as "for the diagnosis, cure, mitigation, treatment, or prevention of disease, or for the purpose of affecting any structure or function of the body." Only cosmetic surgeries promoting the physical or mental health of an individual can qualify for medical deductions. Transgender people have used the diagnosis of gender dysphoria to qualify for deductible health care.

The idea that transition-related care is cosmetic or experimental has been ruled as discriminatory and out of touch with current medical thinking. The AMA and WPATH have specifically rejected these arguments, and courts have affirmed their conclusion. In a case brought by Gay and Lesbian Advocates and Defenders (GLAD), O'Donnabhain v. Commissioner, for instance, the Internal Revenue Service lost its claim that such treatments were cosmetic and experimental when a transgender woman deducted her SRS procedures as a medical expense. Courts have also found that psychotherapy alone is insufficient treatment for gender dysphoria, and that for some people, SRS may be the only effective treatment.

State Medicaid Coverage

In June 2022, the Florida Agency for Healthcare Administration, the agency responsible for overseeing the state's Medicaid service, released a report in which it declared transgender hormone therapy to be "experimental and investigational".

The report was quickly rebuffed by the wider scientific community, with experts from Yale in July publishing an analysis in which they stated that the report ignored accepted scientific studies and consensus regarding gender dysphoria, had its writers chosen from those with ties to anti-LGBTQ groups specifically for their bias, cited sources with no scientific merit - including a student blog post and a letter to the editor, and that if the state used the same standard it used in the report to evaluate other treatments, it would no longer allow Medicaid to pay for a wide array of common medications.

The Yale analysis also stated that "it seems clear that the report is not a serious scientific analysis but, rather, a document crafted to serve a political agenda" and that "medical treatment for gender dysphoria does meet generally accepted professional medical standards and is not experimental or investigational".

Prisoners' rights

In 1992, UC Irvine researchers published an article detailing medical experiments performed on every trans female inmate in the California state prison system, ending with all subjects being indefinitely taken off hormone therapy. The authors wrote: "withdrawal of therapy was also associated with adverse symptoms in 60 of the 86 transsexuals. Rebound androgenization, hot flashes, moodiness, and irritability or depression were the most frequent complaints." At the time, no right to access gender appropriate care existed in California state prisons.

According to the Vera Institute, 16% of trans adults in the US have been incarcerated, compared to 2.7% of cis adults, and trans people make up 59% of prison sexual assault victims.

In September 2011, a California state court denied the request of a California inmate, Lyralisa Stevens, for sex reassignment surgery at the state's expense.

On January 17, 2014, in Kosilek v. Spencer a three-judge panel of the First Circuit Court of Appeals ordered the Massachusetts Department of Corrections to provide Michelle Kosilek, a Massachusetts inmate, with sex reassignment surgery. It said denying the surgery violated Kosilek's Eighth Amendment rights, which included "receiving medically necessary treatment ... even if that treatment strikes some as odd or unorthodox".

On April 3, 2015, the U.S. Department of Justice intervened in a federal lawsuit filed in Georgia to argue that denying hormone treatment for transgender inmates violates their rights. It contended that the state's policy that only allows for continuing treatments begun before incarceration was insufficient and that inmate treatment needs to be based on ongoing assessments. The case was brought by Ashley Diamond, an inmate who had used hormone treatment for seventeen years before entering the Georgia prison system.

On May 11, 2018, the US Bureau of Prisons announced that prison guidelines issued by the Obama Administration in January 2017 to allow transgender prisoners to be transferred to prisons housing inmates of the gender which they identify with had been rescinded and that assigned sex at birth would once again determine where transgender prisoners are jailed.

In August 2022, a federal judge in Nebraska ruled against a transgender woman that'd been denied gender affirming care in prison, and placed in a cell with a male sex offender that proceeded to sexually assault her. In his ruling, the judge declared there to be insufficient evidence of deliberate indifference on the prison's part to the plaintiff's gender dysphoria, and that the plaintiff hadn't sufficiently proven that she'd suffered more than minimal injuries from the sexual assault, stating that he found no support for the notion that a substantial risk of harm or deliberate indifference to it "could be plausibly inferred from a prospective cellmate's conviction of sexual offenses coupled with the alleged vulnerability of a transgender inmate transitioning to a woman in a men's prison".

V-coding

A 2018 report from the Indiana Maurer University School of Law found that it was common for trans women placed in men's prisons to be assigned to cells with aggressive cisgender male cellmates as both a reward and a means of placation for said cellmates, so as to maintain social control and to, as one inmate described it, "keep the violence rate down". Trans women used in this manner are often raped daily. This process is known as "V-coding", and has been described as so common that it is effectively "a central part of a trans woman's sentence".

The report also found it common for correctional officers to publicly strip search trans women inmates, before putting their bodies on display for not only the other correctional officers, but for the other prisoners. Trans women in this situation are sometimes made to dance, present, or masturbate at the CO's discretion.

The prisoners serving as customers for these women are informally referred to as "husbands". Trans women who physically resist the customer's advances are often criminally charged with assault and placed in solitary confinement, the assault charge then being used to extend the woman's prison stay and deny her parole.

Immigration

In 2000, the US Ninth Circuit Court of Appeals concluded that "gay men with female sexual identities [sic] in Mexico constitute a 'particular social group that was persecuted and was entitled to asylum in the US (Hernandez-Montiel v. INS). Since then, several cases have reinforced and clarified the decision. Morales v. Gonzales (2007) is the only published decision in asylum law that uses "male-to-female transsexual" instead of "gay man with female sexual identity".  An immigration judge stated that, under Hernandez-Montiel, Morales would have been eligible for asylum (if not for her criminal conviction).

Critics have argued that allowing transgender people to apply for asylum "would invite a flood of people who could claim a 'well-founded fear' of persecution". Precise numbers are unknown, but Immigration Equality, a nonprofit for LGBT immigrants, estimates hundreds of cases.

The United States has no process for accepting visa requests for third gender citizens from other countries. In 2015, trans HIV activist Amruta Alpesh Soni's request for a visa was delayed because her gender is listed as "T" (for transgender) on her Indian passport. In order to receive a visa, the State Department requires the gender identification on the visa to match the gender identification on the passport.

Military

Currently, transgender people are allowed to fully serve in the military since 2021.

 History 
Discharges for gender transitioning were once commonplace. In one case, a trans person who had had gender-reassignment surgery was discharged from the Air Force Reserve, a decision supported by the Court of Appeals.

 Obama administration 
In 2015, the Pentagon reviewed its policy regarding transgender service members and announced that its ban would be removed. It announced on June 30, 2016, that, effective immediately, existing servicemembers who came out as transgender would no longer be discharged, denied reenlistment, involuntarily separated, or denied continuation of service simply because of their gender, and that, starting in July 2017, people who already identify as transgender were welcome to join the military so long as they had already adapted to their self-identified gender for at least an 18-month period.

 Trump administration 
President Donald Trump tweeted on July 26, 2017, that transgender individuals will not be allowed to "serve in any capacity in the U.S. military". Chairman of the Joint Chiefs of Staff General Joseph Dunford pushed back, saying that the Secretary of Defense needed time to review this order. "In the meantime," he said, "we will continue to treat all of our personnel with respect." On August 1, 2017, the Palm Center released a letter signed by 56 retired generals and admirals, opposing the proposed ban on transgender military service members. The letter stated that, if implemented, the ban would "deprive the military of mission-critical talent" and would compel cisgender service members "to choose between reporting their comrades or disobeying policy". To challenge Trump's intended policy, at least four lawsuits were filed (Jane Doe v. Trump, Stone v. Trump, Karnoski v. Trump, and Stockman v. Trump), as well as bipartisan Senate and House bills (S. 1820 and H.R. 4041). On August 25, 2017, Trump signed a presidential memorandum to formalize his request for an implementation plan from the Secretary of Defense and the Secretary of Homeland Security. Several days later, Secretary of Defense Jim Mattis announced that he would set up a panel of experts to provide recommendations and that, meanwhile, currently serving transgender troops would be allowed to remain. After another memorandum in 2018, and a further memorandum in 2019, the procedures regarding serving in the armed forces were finalized.

 Biden administration 
President Joe Biden overturned the laws the Trump Administration put in place to ban transgender people from serving in the military on January 25, 2021, only five days after he took the oath of office. Biden said, "It is my conviction as Commander in Chief of the Armed Forces that gender identity should not be a bar to military service. Moreover, there is substantial evidence that allowing transgender individuals to serve in the military does not have any meaningful negative impact on the Armed Forces."

Biden's executive order was implemented in a step by step process. The order Trump signed banning transgender people from the military was to be reversed, the Department of Defense was to correct the record of anyone dismissed from service due to their gender identity, and the Secretary of Defense and the Secretary of Homeland Security were to begin the process of allowing transgender service members to serve openly. On April 30, 2021, the United States Department of Defense enacted a new policy which required better medical service and assistance to transgender people serving in the United States Military.

Taxes
IRS Publication 502 lists medical expenses that are tax-deductible to the extent they 1) exceed 7.5% of the individual's adjusted gross income, and 2) were not paid for by any insurance or other third party. For example, a person with $20,000 gross adjusted income can deduct all medical expenses after'' the first $1,500 spent.  If that person incurred $16,000 in medical expenses during the tax year, then $14,500 is deductible.  At higher incomes where the 7.5% floor becomes substantial, the deductible amount is often less than the standard deduction, in which case it is not cost-effective to claim.

IRS Publication 502 includes several deductions that may apply to gender transition treatments, including some operations.
The deduction for operations was denied to a trans woman but was restored in tax court. The deductibility of the other items in Publication 502 was never in dispute.

Sports

19 US States have banned transgender people from sports in various capacities. These states include Texas, Arkansas, Florida, Alabama, Oklahoma, Kentucky,  Mississippi, Tennessee, West Virginia, South Carolina, Utah, South Dakota, Montana, Iowa, Arizona, Idaho, Indiana, Louisiana, and Georgia. The passage of legislation against transgender youth has seen increases in calls to Trans Lifeline, a suicide crisis hotline run by and for transgender people.

In Oklahoma, all students who wish to play sports must submit a notarized affidavit of gender assigned at birth, under penalty of perjury.

In August 2022 USA Cycling, citing new regulations on trans athletes, retroactively stripped trans woman Leia Genis of her silver medal earned at the Track National Championships that had taken place in 2022.

Transgender rights organizations have argued that these discriminatory laws are not about protecting women's sports, but rather are attempts to "undermine the existence of transgender people." Transgender advocates have noted that hormone replacement therapy and testosterone suppression reduces muscle mass and physical strength in transgender women, reducing the possibility of a competitive advantage. Transgender inclusion in sports is supported by the Women's Sports Foundation, the Women's National Basketball Players Association  (WNBPA), the National Women's Law Center, and Athlete Ally, as well as United States Women's National Soccer Team Captain Megan Rapinoe, tennis legend Billie Jean King, WNBA Minnesota Lynx coach Cheryl Reeve, and WNBA star Candace Parker.

The US Department of Education has said transgender students are protected under Title IX.

In November 2022, the 9th Circuit Court of Appeals ruled that the Miss United States of America pageant was allowed to categorically bar trans women from the competition, stating that the pageant's purpose was to celebrate "the ideal vision of American womanhood", and that allowing trans women to compete would make the pageant unable to do this. (This is a different pageant from Miss USA, which does admit trans women.)

In early 2023, the Florida High School Athletics Association recommended that all female athletes be mandated to supply up to date information on their menstrual cycles to a database accessible by their school's administrators. This was speculated by many to be a method of both enforcing abortion restrictions, and detecting any female athletes who might be trans women in violation of the state's ban.

In early 2023, a national proposal was introduced as HR 734, "Protecting Women and Girls in Sports Act."

Summary

See also

 Transgender disenfranchisement in the United States
 Transphobia in the United States
 Identity documents in the United States
 History of transgender people in the United States
 LGBT rights in the United States
 Intersex rights in the United States
 Transgender rights
 Name change
 List of transgender-related topics

References

 
United States